Kevin Rodney Sullivan (born August 3, 1958) is an American film and television actor and film director.

Early life and acting career
Sullivan is a native of San Francisco who began his career as a child actor. He grew up in St. Francis Square in the Fillmore district of San Francisco as the youngest of three children. His father was a bus driver, and his mother was a receptionist for the St. Mary's hospital. According to Sullivan, he was "one step up from a housing project". During sixth grade while performing A Midsummer Night's Dream, Sullivan's talents were picked up by Ann Brebner, who placed him and his entire class as extras in a movie by Sidney Poitier, They Call Me Mr. Tibbs! in 1970. This was his first experience with cinema. Brebner would continue to give him auditions for various roles. In 1970, he was picked up for a job in an Alpha-Bits Cereal commercial, making over $7,000 off of that role alone. He continued to obtain small roles in theater productions and doing commercials. Most notably, He got a role as the Master of Ceremonies during a show of Sesame Street that was being filmed live at Golden Gate Park. He was made to "sit on this big garbage can with a microphone and introduce the various skits," with Jim Henson controlling the puppets.

Sullivan then went on to get a part in a movie called Thumb Tripping, with Meg Foster, following which he got a part in a series called Wee Pals on the Go. The series was based on a comic strip by Morrie Turner and featured an integrated neighborhood. He played the part of Randy, "a kid with a big afro who loved sports," according to Sullivan. For Christmas, the producer of that series gave Sullivan his first 8-millimeter camera with which he first experimented in film. He acquired a scholarship to St. Ignatius College Preparatory, which was a Jesuit all-boys high school located in the Sunset District of San Francisco. "The school had 1,200 boys, only forty of them were black," according to Sullivan. At St. Ignatius, Sullivan was challenged in his class work for the first time, and because of his race, was barred from the theater program as well. "I felt out of place and no one tried to make me feel otherwise," Says Sullivan.

At one point he joined the Young Conservatory of the American Theater, located in downtown San Francisco. As a senior at St. Ignatius, he convinced the theater department to allow him to direct Ceremonies in Dark Old Men, by Lonne Elder; and following this, the school asked him to be the lead in a production of The Tea House of the August Moon.

Due to his successes in his acting career, Sullivan applied to the Juilliard School in New York, which emphasizes the arts. John Houseman, who had at the time recently received an Oscar for his role in The Paper Chase, was his interviewer. Houseman's comments on Sullivan's abilities at the time were thus: "You have talent, but you're only seventeen years old. Most of our students come here after four years of college. I don't think you're ready for New York City just yet". And so, Sullivan ended up at Willamette University in Salem, Oregon instead, where he was offered a scholarship through their theater program. He applied to be an English major, as he was growing increasingly interested in writing. "I was a whale in a fish bowl," says Sullivan, who was quite overqualified for the college's theater program. He ended up being the lead, Proteus, in Two Gentlemen of Verona, for which he had only auditioned as a supporting role. Sullivan was in quite a few plays following that, and was chosen by the school to direct a production of Slow Dance on the Killing Ground, a play by William Hanley. He then decided to produce a play of his own creation, leaving the school to do it as an independent study. He never went back.

In the summer of 1987, Sullivan left for Los Angeles. He began by working with a friend and fellow actor in Hollywood. From there he began to write scripts. On a particular four-day trip to DC, he picked up inspiration for characters in his later works from fellow passengers on his ride who he'd spent time talking to. While his scripts were largely unnoticed, his trip would inspire later works. In the meantime, however, his acting was noticed after he auditioned for small parts in a few movies, including as Lieutenant in More American Graffiti (1979), Tyrone in Night Shift (1982), March in Star Trek II: The Wrath of Khan (1982), and John Grant in The Adventures of Buckaroo Banzai Across the 8th Dimension (1984).

Early screenwriting
At the age of twenty-two when he was able to sell a television script for the first time, it was for an episode of Fame for the ABC network. This connection to ABC allowed him to write the TV drama series Knightwatch in 1988. In 1992, Sullivan directed the pilot for a television series on ABC entitled Moe's World, which is a story narrated by a kid who has been killed in a car crash. The story "tackled" topics such as teenage pregnancy and death as well as other topics that tend to affect teenagers today. However, while ABC bought the pilot, the show was never picked up by that network. Fox considered purchasing the show as well, but did not follow through.

Despite that minor setback, this background allowed Sullivan to jump into directing movies for HBO: the short film "Long Black Song", which was one of three in the America's Dream (1996) anthology movie, and Soul of the Game (1996). The later was a docudrama on how African Americans "broke the baseball color barrier" which follows the "triumphant and tragic stories" of Jackie Robinson, Satchel Paige, and Josh Gibson as they make their way out of the Negro leagues, and into the Majors. "For African Americans in this century," Sullivan told The New York Times regarding Soul of the Game, "one man's victory is often the result of others paving the way, sometimes making the triumph both bitter and sweet". The movie was eventually pulled from air and is no longer available on television. Sullivan's successes presented him with many opportunities, including the ability to collaborate with George Lucas on Red Tails, a story about the Tuskegee airmen, a famous African American Aerial unit from World War II; as well as with Norman Jewison on an adaptation of The Good Times Are Killing Me. In addition to these series, Sullivan also produced Frank's Place (1987), I'll Fly Away (1991), Boy Meets Girl (1993), and Cosmic Slop (1994), before his first major production.

Major film productions
The movie How Stella Got Her Groove Back (1998) swept the NAACP Image Awards, won the award for Outstanding Picture and was Kevin Rodney Sullivan's Hollywood directorial debut. The movie was based on a popular novel at the time, and follows the story of Stella (played by Angela Bassett) who is a single mother of one who finds love in Jamaica with a man much younger than her named Winston (played by Taye Diggs). It also had other notable stars such as Whoopi Goldberg, who plays Stella's best friend in the movie. The film, while not the first to use a tropic paradise as its background, "may be the first to blatantly portray a tropical paradise as a sexual mecca beckoning tired American businesswomen to shed their clothes and inhibitions," according to a review by The New York Times. Despite some mixed reviews, Sullivan still "provides a movie that speaks in a recognizable way to a black audience, particularly black women who have found themselves omitted from serious screen depiction over the decades".

Sullivan's next major production was Conviction (2002), based on the autobiography of Carl Upchurch entitled Convicted in the Womb. The movie wrestles with race relations, and issues pertaining to jail and gang violence, as well as the use of derogatory terms towards people of African descent. The main character, after being reformed in jail goes on a mission to help lower youth violence in America, by inviting all the largest gang's leaders to a church meeting about violence. Upchurch himself had a cameo within the movie as a jail cell guard.

He then went on to produce Barbershop 2: Back in Business (2004), which was a sequel to the original Barbershop (2002), with the entire original cast returning with some additions. Notable cast members include: Ice Cube, Cedric the Entertainer, Anthony Anderson, and a brief cameo by Queen Latifah in promotion of her own spinoff of the Barbershop franchise.

The latest major film production by Kevin Sullivan was Guess Who (2005); the idea for the movie was originally a collaborative effort by Ashton Kutcher and Bernie Mac. As Kutcher explained in an interview about his choice of directors, "I had a conversation with Kevin before we started the movie. And the reason that I liked Kevin -- we picked Kevin to do the movie, Bernie and I did, because what he knew the movie needed was heart. And he was more concerned about the heart than the comedy". The movie focuses on a young white man (played by Kutcher) attempting to marry an African American woman, while trying to seek the approval of her overprotective father (played by Bernie Mac). Working with Sullivan did have its impact upon the film, as Kutcher explains, "Well, working for Kevin Sullivan was a very different experience for me. Kevin didn't just let us go. At no point in time did Kevin just let us go... And I think that that brought a different performance for each of us from what we'd done before". The movie received mostly mixed reviews.

Recent screenwriting
In the four years between How Stella Got Her Groove Back and Conviction, Sullivan wrote and collaborated with the producers of The West Wing (2000), which followed a fictional White House staff about on various fictional activities.

Sullivan then developed a pilot for the series Watching Ellie (2002), and wrote some scripts for The Guardian (2002) which was a crime drama that ran for two seasons.

Following the release of Conviction, he began working on scripts for The Henry Lee Project (2003). This series followed a veteran policeman turned private detective. The part of the policeman was played by notable actor Danny Glover.

The most notable of his recent screenplays is 30 Rock (2008), which has received national acclaim and many awards including Emmy awards for Outstanding Comedy Series in 2007, 2008 and 2009. The show was renewed by NBC for a sixth season in 2010. Tina Fey was the original project writer, and created the storyline to be based on her own life story. Sullivan collaborated with three other producers, including Alec Baldwin on this show, especially on the second season. However, despite winning awards for being an outstanding comedy, 30 Rock has been chronically underrated throughout its six seasons of being on air, with a viewership of nearly 5.3 million viewers.

Filmography
 More American Graffiti (1979) - Lieutenant 
 Star Trek II: The Wrath of Khan (1982) - March
 Night Shift (1982) - Tyrone 
 The Facts of Life (1983, TV Series) - Marshall Ramsey
 The Adventures of Buckaroo Banzai Across the 8th Dimension (1984) - John Gant 
 Frank's Place (1987, TV Series)
 Knightwatch (1988, TV Series)
 Moe's World (1990)
 I'll Fly Away (1991, TV Series)
 Boy Meets Girl (1993)
 Cosmic Slop (1994)
 America's Dream (1996)
 Soul of the Game (1996)
 How Stella Got Her Groove Back (1998)
 The West Wing (2000, TV Series)
 Watching Ellie (2002, TV Series)
 The Guardian (2002, TV Series)
 Conviction (2002)
 The Henry Lee Project (2003, TV Series)
 Barbershop 2: Back in Business (2004)
 Guess Who (2005)
 30 Rock (2008, TV series)
 Lincoln Heights (2009, TV series)
 Eastwick (2010, TV series)
 Modern Family (2010, TV series)
 NCIS (2011, TV series)
 Anger Management (2013, TV series)
 Grey's Anatomy (2016–18, TV series)
 How to Get Away with Murder (2016, TV series)
 Notorious (2016, TV series)
 Being Mary Jane (2017, TV series)
 Dynasty (2017, TV series)
 Quantico (2018, TV series)
 Riverdale (2017–18, TV series)
 Titans (2018–19, TV series)
 You (2019, TV series)
 Evil (2019, TV series)
 This Is Us (2021, TV series)
 Episode #79: "There"
 Rise (TBD, film)

References

External links
 

1958 births
African-American film directors
African-American television directors
Film producers from California
American male screenwriters
American television directors
Film directors from San Francisco
Living people
Screenwriters from California
21st-century African-American people
20th-century African-American people